Albert Edward Jacob (1858 – 26 February 1929) was Unionist MP for Liverpool East Toxteth. He was elected at the 1924 general election, and held the seat until his death, causing a by-election, which was won by fellow Unionist Henry Mond.

References

1858 births
1929 deaths
UK MPs 1924–1929
Conservative Party (UK) MPs for English constituencies
Members of the Parliament of the United Kingdom for Liverpool constituencies